Masis or Massis (Armenian: Մասիս) is an Armenian masculine given name that may refer to
Masis Aram Gözbek (born 1987), Turkish musician, conductor and composer
Masis Hambarsounian (born 1951), Armenian-Iranian boxer
 Masis Voskanyan (born 1990), Armenian football player

Armenian masculine given names